is a subway station in Nerima, Tokyo, Japan, operated by Tokyo Metro.

Lines

Station layout
The station consists of an island platform serving two tracks. The platforms are equipped with waist-height platform edge doors.

Platforms

History

Heiwadai Station opened on 24 June 1983, on the Yūrakuchō Line. 

The station facilities were inherited by Tokyo Metro after the privatization of the Teito Rapid Transit Authority (TRTA) in 2004.

Fukutoshin Line services commenced on 14 June 2008.

Waist-height platform edge doors were installed in September 2010.

Surrounding area
 Japanese Ground Self Defense Force Camp Nerima
 Nerima-kasugachō Station (on the Toei Ōedo Line)

References

External links

 Tokyo Metro station information 

Railway stations in Japan opened in 1983
Stations of Tokyo Metro
Tokyo Metro Yurakucho Line
Tokyo Metro Fukutoshin Line
Railway stations in Tokyo